Miloš Pavlović (born 27 November 1983) is a Serbian professional footballer who plays as a defensive midfielder for FK Zemun.

Club career
Pavlović started out at Radnički Beograd, before switching to Voždovac in the 2005 summer transfer window. He subsequently moved abroad to Portugal and signed with Académica in August 2006. In January 2009, Pavlović was transferred to Romanian club Vaslui.

In the summer of 2014, Pavlović returned to his homeland and joined his former club Voždovac.

International career
Pavlović represented Serbia and Montenegro at under-21 level in 2006. He was part of the team at the 2006 UEFA European Under-21 Championship.

Statistics

Honours
Vaslui
 Cupa României: Runner-up 2009–10

References

External links
 Srbijafudbal profile
 
 

1983 births
Living people
Serbian footballers
Serbian expatriate footballers
Serbia and Montenegro footballers
Serbia and Montenegro under-21 international footballers
Associação Académica de Coimbra – O.A.F. players
FC Rapid București players
FC Vaslui players
FK Radnički Beograd players
Doxa Katokopias FC players
FK Voždovac players
FK Zemun players
Footballers from Belgrade
Liga I players
Primeira Liga players
Cypriot First Division players
Serbian SuperLiga players
First League of Serbia and Montenegro players
Association football midfielders
Serbian expatriate sportspeople in Cyprus
Serbian expatriate sportspeople in Portugal
Serbian expatriate sportspeople in Romania
Expatriate footballers in Cyprus
Expatriate footballers in Portugal
Expatriate footballers in Romania